The 2022–23 NJIT Highlanders men's basketball team represented the New Jersey Institute of Technology in the 2022–23 NCAA Division I men's basketball season. The Highlanders, led by seventh-year head coach Brian Kennedy, played their home games at the Wellness and Events Center in Newark, New Jersey as third-year members of the America East Conference. They finished the season 7–23, 4–12 in America East Play to finish in 8th place. They lost in the quarterfinals of the America East tournament to Vermont.

Previous season
They finished the season 11–18, 6–12 in America East Play to finish in 8th place. They lost in the quarterfinals of the America East tournament to Vermont.

Roster

Schedule and results

|-
!colspan=12 style=| Non-conference regular season

|-
!colspan=12 style=| America East regular season

|-
!colspan=12 style=| America East tournament

Source

References

NJIT Highlanders men's basketball seasons
NJIT Highlanders
NJIT Highlanders men's basketball
NJIT Highlanders men's basketball